Vikas Kapoor (November 17, 1961) is the CEO of Mezocliq, an enterprise technology company.

Early life and education 
Kapoor was born in Ajmer, India on November 17, 1961. He grew up in India, England and Australia. He is the son of Kusum and Major General S. B. L. Kapoor, VSM (Retd) of the Indian Army. At 16, Kapoor won a scholarship to study at Sevenoaks School in Kent, England, where he received his high school diploma. In 1984, he graduated magna cum laude, with a Bachelor of Arts in Philosophy from Princeton University. In 1989, he graduated from Harvard with a dual degree in Philosophy from the Graduate School of Arts & Sciences and an MBA from the Harvard Business School, where he was a Baker Scholar.

Career 
Kapoor's first job following business school was as a business analyst in the financial services practice of McKinsey & Company. Thereafter, he was a Principal at the global management consulting firm A.T. Kearney. In 1994, Kapoor co-founded the global consulting company Mitchell Madison Group. In 1999, the firm was sold to USWeb/CKS.

In 2000, Kapoor was appointed President and CEO of Walker Digital, an incubator of several internet businesses including priceline.com. In 2002, Kapoor was appointed CEO of Toronto-based Delano Technology Company, a publicly held customer relationship management software company. In January 2004, Kapoor was appointed CEO and President of iQor (formerly IRMC), a customer-service and outsourcing company.

In 2017, Kapoor spoke at the Forbes CIO Summit, Milken Global Institute and MIT Chief Data Officer & Information Quality Symposium on the topic of data governance.

Personal life 
Kapoor is a Trustee of the Newport Festivals Foundation, a member of the board of directors of The Metropolitan Opera and a member of the Council of Foreign Relations.

Kapoor and his wife Jaishri have three children, twin daughters Riya and Sara and a son, Kavi.

References

External links 
 
 

1961 births
Living people
Indian emigrants to the United States
21st-century American businesspeople
Princeton University alumni
American people of Indian descent
American technology chief executives
American technology company founders
American chairpersons of corporations
Indian company founders
Harvard Business School alumni